Vibrio ordalii is a Gram-negative, rod-shaped bacterium. It causes vibriosis in fish. Its type strain is ATCC 33509 (=DF3K =Dom F3 kid).

References

Further reading

Mutharia, Lucy M., and Paul A. Amor. "Monoclonal antibodies against Vibrio anguillarum O2 and Vibrio ordalii identify antigenic differences in lipopolysaccharide O-antigens." FEMS Microbiology Letters 123.3 (1994): 289–298.
Rubio, Andrés Silva, and Rubén Avendaño Herrera. "Vibriosis en Chile: Caracterización de los Agentes Etiológicos, una Necesidad para el Desarrollo de Medidas Eficaces de Prevención Vibriosis in Chile: Characterization of the Etiological Agents, a Need to Develop Prevention Strategies."
Akayli, T., et al. "Identification and Genotyping of Vibrio ordalii: A Comparison of Different Methods." (2010).

External links

LPSN
Type strain of Vibrio ordalii at BacDive -  the Bacterial Diversity Metadatabase

Vibrionales
Bacteria described in 1982